KCNM (1080 AM) was a radio station licensed to Saipan, Northern Mariana Islands, which aired a Talk format. It was an affiliate of Fox News. The final owner was Cecilia Lifoifoi, through licensee Holonet Corporation.

History
The station was first licensed, as WSZE, on 1053 kHz. The station was assigned the KCNM call letters by the Federal Communications Commission on September 1, 1984. In 1995,  KCNM applied to move to 1080 kHz.

The station usually played country music, and once provided broadcasting in chamorro and carolinian at a limited time period. It became a news station from 2002.

The station's license was deleted on March 6, 2020.

References

External links
FCC Station Search Details: DKCNM  (Facility ID: 28864)
FCC History Cards for KCNM (covering 1978-1983 )

Defunct radio stations in the United States
CNM
Radio stations established in 1984
Radio stations disestablished in 2020
1984 establishments in the Northern Mariana Islands
2020 disestablishments in the Northern Mariana Islands
CNM
Saipan
News and talk radio stations in insular areas of the United States